Parker's emo skink or Viti copper-headed skink (Emoia parkeri) is a species of lizard in the family Scincidae. It is found in Fiji.

References

Emoia
Reptiles described in 1980
Taxa named by Walter Creighton Brown
Taxa named by John C. Pernetta
Taxa named by Dick Watling